Colwyn Iestyn John Philipps, 3rd Viscount St Davids (30 January 1939 – 26 April 2009) was a British businessman, Conservative politician and writer on music. Besides his viscountcy, he also held the older titles of Baron Strange of Knockin (1299), Baron Hungerford (1426), and Baron de Moleyns (1445), & the Baronetcy of Picton Castle (1621). He was also a co-heir to the barony of Grey de Ruthyn.

Background and education
Philipps was the son of Jestyn Philipps, 2nd Viscount St Davids and Doreen Guinness Jowett. He was educated at Dulwich College Preparatory School, Haverfordwest Grammar School, Sevenoaks School and in Melbourne, Australia. He returned to the UK to pursue his career, later studying at King's College London where he took a Certificate in Advanced Musical Studies in 1989.

Career
Philipps was a 2nd Lieutenant in the Welsh Guards before he became a partner in the London stockbroking firm of Scrimgeour Kemp-Gee, which was later absorbed by Citicorp. He had a keen interest in music, both historically and as a manuscript collector (at one point owning the largest private collection in existence). He specialized in the life and works of Rossini, contributed to "Music & Letters" (along with various other musicological works) and was the bibliographer of the Rossini Foundation in Pesaro, Italy.

Lord St Davids succeeded his father in the viscountcy in 1991. He served under John Major as a Lord-in-waiting from 1992 to 1994 and was a Deputy Speaker of the House of Lords from 1995. He was the only Conservative member of the Welsh National Assembly Advisory Group, and his work in relation to Welsh devolution was described by Dafydd Elis-Thomas (Welsh Assembly Presiding Officer) as "the most significant contribution of any Welsh Conservative politician to the cause of devolution; If Ron Davies was the architect of devolution, Colwyn was his enthusiastic draughtsman. His encouragement was unstinting". As a hereditary peer, he was excluded from the House by the House of Lords Act 1999.

Family
Lord St Davids married Augusta Victoria Correa y Larraín Ugarte from Santiago, Chile in 1965. They had two children:

 Rhodri Colwyn Philipps, 4th Viscount St Davids (b. 16 September 1966)
 Hon. Roland Augusto Iestyn Estanislao Philipps (b. 9 Apr 1970), better known as Todd Sharpville, a blues guitarist

St Davids died in April 2009, aged 70, and was succeeded by his elder son. The requiem mass held at his funeral at St. Davids Cathedral on 6 May 2009 was believed to be the first Catholic Mass to be held there since the Reformation.

Arms

References

External links 

 Lord St Davids at Burke's Peerage
 Analog Magazine cover archive

1939 births
2009 deaths
People educated at Sevenoaks School
Alumni of King's College London
Conservative Party (UK) Baronesses- and Lords-in-Waiting
Welsh Guards officers
Barons Strange
Barons Hungerford
3
20th-century English nobility
St Davids